Ajuga , also known as bugleweed, ground pine, carpet bugle, or just bugle, is a genus of 40 species annual and perennial herbaceous flowering plants in the Ajugeae tribe of the mint family Lamiaceae, with most species native to Europe, Asia, and Africa, but also two species in southeastern Australia. They grow to 5–50 cm tall, with opposite leaves.

Species
Species accepted within Ajuga include:
 Ajuga arabica P.H.Davis – Saudi Arabia
 Ajuga australis R.Br. - Australia
 Ajuga bombycina Boiss. – Aegean Islands, Turkey
 Ajuga boninsimae Maxim. – Ogasawara-shoto (Bonin Islands of Japan)
 Ajuga brachystemon Maxim. – Uttarakhand, Nepal, northern India
 Ajuga campylantha Diels – Yunnan
 Ajuga campylanthoides C.Y.Wu & C.Chen – Tibet, central China
 Ajuga chamaecistus Ging. ex Benth. – Iran, Afghanistan
 Ajuga chamaepitys (L.) Schreb. – central + southern Europe, central + southwestern Asia
 Ajuga chasmophila P.H.Davis – Syria
 Ajuga ciliata Bunge – China, Korea, Japan
 Ajuga davisiana Kit Tan & Yildiz – Turkey
 Ajuga decaryana Danguy ex R.A.Clement – Madagascar
 Ajuga decumbens  Thunb. – decumbent bugle – China, Korea, Japan, Taiwan, Ryukyu Islands
 Ajuga dictyocarpa Hayata – - China, Vietnam, Taiwan, Ryukyu Islands
 Ajuga fauriei H.Lév. & Vaniot – Korea
 Ajuga flaccida Baker – Madagascar
 Ajuga forrestii Diels – China, Tibet, Nepal
 Ajuga genevensis L. – central + southern Europe, Caucasus; naturalized in North America
 Ajuga grandiflora Stapf – South Australia
 Ajuga incisia Maxim – Honshu Island in Japan
 Ajuga integrifolia Buch.-Ham. – central + eastern Africa, southern Asia (Saudi Arabia, Iran, India, China, Indonesia, etc.), New Guinea
 Ajuga iva (L.) Schreb. – Mediterranean region from Canary Islands and Madeira to Turkey and Palestine
 Ajuga japonica Miq. – Japan
 Ajuga laxmannii (Murray) Benth. – southeastern Europe from Czech Republic to Greece; Turkey, Caucasus
 Ajuga leucantha Lukhoba – Uganda, DRoC, Ethiopia
 Ajuga linearifolia Pamp. – China
 Ajuga lobata D.Don – China, Nepal, Bhutan, Assam, Myanmar
 Ajuga lupulina Maxim.  - China, Nepal, Bhutan, Assam
 Ajuga macrosperma Wall. ex Benth. – China, Nepal, Bhutan, Assam, northern + eastern India, northern Indochina
 Ajuga makinoi Nakai – Honshu Island in Japan
 Ajuga mollis Gladkova – Crimea
 Ajuga multiflora Bunge – Korean pyramid bugle – China, Korea, Chita region of Siberia, Amur, Primorye
 Ajuga nipponensis Makino – China, Korea, Japan, Vietnam, Taiwan
 Ajuga novoguineensis A.J.Paton & R.J.Johns – New Guinea
 Ajuga nubigena Diels – Tibet, Sichuan, Yunnan
 Ajuga oblongata M.Bieb. – Iraq, Caucasus
 Ajuga oocephala Baker – Madagascar
 Ajuga ophrydris Burch. ex Benth. – South Africa, Eswatini, Lesotho
 Ajuga orientalis L. – eastern Mediterranean
 Ajuga ovalifolia Bureau & Franch. – China
 Ajuga palaestina - Palestine (Region), Turkey
 Ajuga pantantha Hand.-Mazz. – Yunnan
 Ajuga parviflora Benth. – Afghanistan, Pakistan, northern India, Nepal
 Ajuga piskoi  Degen & Bald. – Albania, Yugoslavia
 Ajuga postii Briq. – Turkey
 Ajuga pygmaea A.Gray – China, Japan, Taiwan, Ryukyu Islands
 Ajuga pyramidalis L. – central + southern Europe
 Ajuga relicta P.H.Davis – Turkey
 Ajuga reptans L. – Europe, Algeria, Tunisia, Iran, Turkey, Caucasus; naturalized in New Zealand, North America, and Venezuela
 Ajuga robusta Baker – Madagascar
 Ajuga salicifolia (L.) Schreb. – Balkans, Crimea, southern Russia, Turkey
 Ajuga saxicola Assadi & Jamzad – Iran
 Ajuga sciaphila W.W.Sm..- southwestern China
 Ajuga shikotanensis Miyabe & Tatew – Japan, Kuril Islands
 Ajuga sinuata  R.Br. – New South Wales
 Ajuga spectabilis Nakai – Korean bugle – Korea
 Ajuga taiwanensis Nakai ex Murata – Taiwan, Ryukyu Islands, Philippines
 Ajuga tenorii C.Presl in J.S.Presl & C.B.Presl – Italy
 Ajuga turkestanica  (Regel) Briq. – Tajikistan, Uzbekistan
 Ajuga vesiculifera Herder – Kyrgyzstan
 Ajuga vestita Boiss. – Turkey, Iran
 Ajuga xylorrhiza Kit Tan – Turkey
 Ajuga yesoensis Maxim. ex Franch. & Sav. – Japan
 Ajuga zakhoensis Rech.f. – Iraq

Gallery

References

 
Lamiaceae genera
Garden plants
Taxa named by Carl Linnaeus